Oktyabrsky is a rural locality (a settlement) in Kyakhtinsky District, Republic of Buryatia, Russia. The population was 345 as of 2010. There are 8 streets.

Geography 
Oktyabrsky is located 63 km southeast of Kyakhta (the district's administrative centre) by road. Bolshaya Kudara is the nearest rural locality.

References 

Rural localities in Kyakhtinsky District